Kodai road is a railway station in Tamil Nadu state, India, lying between Dindigul and Madurai at . It is formally listed as Kodaikanal Road (railway station code KQN).

History
In 1875, the Great Southern of India Railway Co. extended its line from Chennai to Tirunelveli and a train station named Kodai Road was built near Ammaianayakkanur village, to facilitate visits to the then new hill station of Kodaikanal. It has been operated by the Southern Railway Zone of the Indian Railways since 1951.

Once upon a time, it acted as a Junction railway station. The line was existed during the period of 1920 to 1930. This line goes through Nilakottai, Periyakulam, Cumbum, Kumily lower camp. It had several branch lines one from Periyakulam to Kodaikanal foothills, and the other one from Teni to Kottagudi via Bodi Nayakkanur, Kurangani(Just located 5 km distance from Topslip Station where Kundala valley railway line ends). But later this line was dematerialized due to unknown reasons. The map of this line is found in Imperial Gazetter of India.

Transfer point

Kodai Road continues to serve as the rail to bus transfer point for passengers  going to the now popular tourist destination of Kodaikanal, about 2 hours distant via the  SH-156 Ghat Road. It also serves the nearby village of Kolinchipatti. This village is famous for flowers. Among the approximately 30 trains per day that serve Kodai Road is the Pandian Express, which runs between Chennai Egmore and Madurai.

Business hub
This station is also a business hub with retail shops open for 24 hours day. It is on the National Highway 7, which is heavily used by lorry traffic
in this festival celebrated by Different Community 

Pillai(Mudaliar-Some other Sub division),  Mukulathor (Kallar – Maravar-Agarmudiar), Konar, Chettiar, Schedule Caste also. It is a great function for all the castes; per day one Caste doing the arrangements.content to be removed (Caste Discriminated Scenario)

Final 3 day common for all Maavilaku, Manjal neeral aadal, Urimaram, Theichatti, Paalkudam, Pongal, Kidavettu. Every day Muthu Marriamman will come in different Charat with different costume.

See also
 List of railway stations in India

External links
 Kodai road train schedule

References

Railway stations in Dindigul district
Madurai railway division
Railway stations opened in 1875